Margaret Taylor Lucas (born November 29, 1991) is an American professional basketball player who last played for the Dallas Wings of the Women's National Basketball Association (WNBA). From January 5, 2021, she joined Luleå Basket, playing in the SBL.

College career
In Lucas's senior year, she led the Penn State Lady Lions basketball in scoring with 21.0 points per game. She also registered 4.2 rebounds and 2.2 assists. The Lady Lions finished that season with a 24-8 overall record. She scored 2,510 total career points, second in school history. She recorded 365 3-pointers, the 12th highest career total in NCAA history.

Penn  State statistics
Source

References

External links
 Penn State Lady Lions bio

1991 births
Living people
All-American college women's basketball players
American women's basketball players
Atlanta Dream players
Basketball players from Philadelphia
Dallas Wings players
Germantown Academy alumni
Indiana Fever players
McDonald's High School All-Americans
Parade High School All-Americans (girls' basketball)
Penn State Lady Lions basketball players
Phoenix Mercury draft picks
Shooting guards